Uganda Martyrs University School of Medicine (UMUSM),  whose official name is Mother Kevin Postgraduate Medical School (MKPMS), is the school of medicine of Uganda Martyrs University. , the medical school is the newest medical school in Uganda, having been established in 2010. Currently the school provides postgraduate medical education in the disciplines of Pediatrics, Internal Medicine, Surgery, Obstetrics/Gynecology and Emergency Medicine.

Location
The school is housed on the premises of St. Francis Hospital Nsambya, a faith based not-for-profit hospital owned by the Roman Catholic Archdiocese of Kampala. The coordinates of the school are:0°18'06.0"N 32°35'07.0"E (Latitude:0.301667; Longitude:32.585289).

Overview
UMU School of Medicine is the school of medicine of Uganda Martyrs University, with headquarters at Nkozi, Mpigi District. Established in 2010, the school is headed by the Dean. The current dean is Professor Paul D'Arbela. The clinical teaching disciplines of the medical school are integrated with St. Francis Hospital Nsambya, a 540-bed community hospital owned by the Roman Catholic Archdiocese of Kampala and is administered by the Little Sisters of St. Francis.

Departments
As of February 2015, the following departments constituted Uganda Martyrs University School of Medicine:
1. Department of Internal Medicine 2. Department of Obstetrics and Gynecology 3. Department of Pediatrics & Child Health 4. Department of Surgery and 5. Department of Emergency Medicine.

Undergraduate Courses
Currently there are no undergraduate courses offered at UMU School of Medicine.

Graduate Courses
The following postgraduate courses are offered at Uganda Martyrs University School of Medicine:
 Master of Medicine (MMed) - A clinical degree awarded following three years of instruction and examination in any of the following specialties: (a) Internal Medicine (b) Obstetrics and Gynecology (c) Pediatrics (d) Emergency Medicine and (e) Surgery.

See also
 Education in Uganda
 Paul D'Arbela
 Charles Olweny
 Uganda Martyrs University
 List of universities in Uganda
 List of medical schools in Uganda
 List of hospitals in Uganda

References

External links
 Uganda Martyrs University Homepage

Medical schools in Uganda
Educational institutions established in 2010
Uganda Martyrs University
2010 establishments in Uganda